Rosaura del Carmen Sánchez Luján, known as Rosi Sánchez (born 2 December 1974) is a Spanish former basketball player who played most of her career in local club Sandra Gran Canaria and in the Italian League. She won two Spanish Cups, two Italian Leagues and the 1999 Ronchetti Cup. With the Spanish national team she won two bronze medals in the EuroBasket. She played in the EuroCup Women from 2006 to 2011 with four different teams.

National team
Sánchez made her debut with the senior team in 1997, when she was 22 years old. She played from 1996 to 2004, with 121 caps with 7.1 PPG, participating in the Athens 2004 Olympics, two World Championships and three EuroBaskets:

5th 1991 FIBA Europe Under-16 Championship (youth)
5th 1997 Eurobasket
 2001 Eurobasket
5th 2002 World Championship
 2003 Eurobasket
6th 2004 Summer Olympics

References

1974 births
Living people
Spanish women's basketball players
Olympic basketball players of Spain
Basketball players at the 2004 Summer Olympics
Small forwards
CB Islas Canarias players